The Divisiones Regionales de Fútbol in the Community of Aragón, organized by l the Aragon Football Federation:
Regional Preferente, 2 Groups of 18 teams (Level 6 of the Spanish football pyramid)
Primera Regional, 4 Groups of 18 teams (Level 7)
Segunda Regional, 5 Groups of 18 teams (Level 8)
Segunda Regional B, 1 Group of 18 teams (Level 9)
Tercera Regional, 3 Groups of 18 teams (Level 10)

League chronology
Timeline

Regional Preferente

Regional Preferente is the sixth level of competition of the Spanish football league system in the Community of Aragón.

2019–20 season teams

Champions

Primera Regional

Primera Regional is the seventh level of competition of the Spanish football league system in the Community of Aragón.

Segunda Regional

Segunda Regional is the 8th level of competition of the Spanish football league system in the Community of Aragón.

Segunda Regional B

Segunda Regional B is the 9th level of competition of the Spanish football league system in the Community of Aragón.

Tercera Regional

Tercera Regional is the tenth level of competition of the Spanish football league system in the Community of Aragón.

External links
Federación Aragonesa de Fútbol
Futbolme

Divisiones Regionales de Fútbol
Football in Aragon